At least two vessels of the Royal Navy have been named HMS Destruction.

HMS Destruction (1804)

Destruction was a  bomb vessel launched in 1804. Lieutenant Peter Wright commissioned her in 1805 for the Downs station. She was paid off in June 1806 and sold on 27 August 1806.

HMS Destruction (1814)
Destruction was an American gunboat captured at the Battle of Lake Borgne on 14 December 1814. She remained in service until at least 4 June 1815. Prize money for her and the other vessels captured at the battle was paid in July 1821.

Citations

References
 
 Paullin, Charles Oscar and Frederic Logan Paxson (1914) Guide to the materials in London archives for the history of the United States since 1783. (Carnegie Institution of Washington).
 

Royal Navy ship names